The 2015 season was the current Tampa Bay Rowdies sixth season of existence, and fifth playing in the North American Soccer League, the second tier of American soccer pyramid. Including the original Rowdies franchise and the Tampa Bay Mutiny, this was the 28th season of professional soccer in the Tampa Bay area.

Summary
The Tampa Bay Rowdies' new manager was Thomas Rongen, replacing Ricky Hill, who was dismissed after the 2014 season. Rongen had a prior connection to soccer in the area, as he was the first manager of the MLS Tampa Bay Mutiny during their inaugural season of 1996. The Rowdies brought back another familiar local figure when Farrukh Quraishi, who had been a player and a youth development director for the original Rowdies, was named general manager.

In March 2015, the Rowdies traveled to Portugal to play several preseason friendlies against clubs in the Portuguese second and third divisions. It was the first time that the current club had undertaken an international tour.

The Rowdies lost only one match during the NASL spring season, good for second place in the table. After starting the fall season 2-1-6, however, club owner Bill Edwards dismissed both manager Thomas Rongen and general manager Farrukh Quraishi, much to the chagrin of many of the team's fans.  "They had a five-year plan, and I have a one-year plan," said Edwards regarding the firings. Assistant Stuart Campbell was promoted to manager and led the team to a 3-4-4 record. The Rowdies finished the fall season in 8th out of 11 teams in the league table and missed the playoffs.

Club 
as of November 14, 2015

 #8 Forward, Marcelo Saragosa of  Brazil served as team captain

Technical staff
  Farrukh Quraishi –  President & General Manager (fired August 21, 2015)
  Perry Van der Beck – Assistant General Manager/Vice President of Community Relations
  Thomas Rongen - Head Coach (fired August 21, 2015)
  Stuart Campbell – Assistant Coach (promoted to head coach August 2015)
  Stuart Dobson - Goalkeeper Coach
  Eric Arbuzow - Assistant Coach
  Jason Riley – Strength & Conditioning Coach
  Malcolm Phillips – Equipment Manager
  Dr. Koco Eaton - Team Physician/Orthopedic Surgeon
  Dr. Sanjay Menon – Team Physician/Orthopedic Surgeon
  Dr. Christopher Salud – Team Physician
  Andrew Keane - Head Athletic Trainer
  Laura Tllinghast Hine - Yoga Instructor
  Dr. Samuel Meyers - Team Chiropractor

Front office
  Bill Edwards – Chairman, Chief Executive Officer & Governor
  Andrew Nestor – Director
  David Laxer – Director
  Lee Cohen – Vice President & Chief Operating Officer

Competitions

Friendlies

NASL Spring season

Standings

Results summary

Results by round

Match reports

NASL Fall season

Standings

Results summary

Results by round

Match reports

U.S. Open Cup

Transfers

In

Out

Squad statistics

Goal scorers

Disciplinary record

References 

Tampa Bay Rowdies
Tampa Bay Rowdies (2010–) seasons
Tampa Bay Rowdies
Tampa Bay Rowdies
Sports in St. Petersburg, Florida